KRDU (1130 AM) is a commercial radio station licensed to Dinuba, California, and serving the Fresno-Visalia radio market.  It airs a religious radio format and is owned by iHeartMedia, Inc.  KRDU is regarded as America's first commercial Christian radio station.  The studios and offices are located on Shaw Avenue in North Fresno.

KRDU broadcasts at 5,000 watts by day and is a rare AM station that increases its power at night to 6,200 watts.  It uses a directional antenna at all times.  The transmitter towers are off Road 136 in Cutler, California.   As of 2019, KRDU is the radio home of the Fresno Grizzlies, a Pacific Coast League Triple A minor league baseball team connected with the Colorado Rockies.

History
KRDU signed on the air on December 26, 1948, at 1130 kilocycles.  It was owned by the Radio Dinuba Company with studios on L Street.  The call sign represents Radio DinUba.  At first it was a daytimer, required to go off the air at night and powered at only 250 watts. In 1949, it moved to 1240 kHz with 250 watts full-time.

In 1961, it moved back to 1130 kHz with full-time authorization, powered at 1,000 watts around the clock.  In 1975, it added an FM station, KLTA (now KSOF, still co-owned with KRDU).

In the 1990s, the power was increased to its current 5,000 watts days and 6,200 watts nights.  In 1999, KRDU was acquired by AMFM, Inc.  AMFM was acquired by Clear Channel Communications, which later changed its name to iHeartMedia.

References

External links

Talk radio stations in the United States
RDU
Mass media in Fresno County, California
Mass media in Tulare County, California
Radio stations established in 1947
1946 establishments in California
IHeartMedia radio stations